Pollenia dasypoda is a species of cluster fly in the family Polleniidae.

Distribution
India, Pakistan, Austria, Bulgaria, Czech Republic, Egypt, Georgia, Germany, Greece, Hungary, Iran, Israel, Italy, Kazakhstan, Lebanon, Moldova, Poland, Romania, Russia, Saudi Arabia, Slovakia, Syria, Tajikistan, Turkey, Ukraine, West Bank.

References

Polleniidae
Insects described in 1881
Taxa named by Josef Aloizievitsch Portschinsky
Diptera of Europe
Diptera of Asia